Tommy "ReinXeed" Johansson  (born October 26, 1987), is a Swedish vocalist and guitarist known for his work as a guitarist for Swedish metal band Sabaton and as lead vocalist and guitarist of the band Majestica (formerly ReinXeed), a power metal band from Boden, Sweden. In 2009 he was Karaoke Music Champion in Sweden.

In 2016 he joined Sabaton as a guitarist, replacing Thobbe Englund. He is a tenor.

Johansson has recorded three albums with Christian Melodic Neoclassical Power Metal band Golden Resurrection alongside singer Christian Liljegren of Narnia.

Discography
With Sabaton:
 The Great War (2019)
 The War to End All Wars (2022)

With Reinxeed/Majestica:
 The Light (2008)
 Higher (2009)
 Majestic (2010)
 1912 (2011)
 Swedish Hitz Goes Metal (2011)
 Welcome to the Theater (2012)
 A New World (2013)
 Swedish Hitz Goes Metal Vol.2 (2013)
 Above the Sky (2019)
 A Christmas Carol (2020)
 Metal United (2021)

With Golden Resurrection:
 Glory to My King (2010)
 Man with a Mission (2011)
 One Voice for the Kingdom (2013)

With Memories of Old:
 The Land of Xia (single) (2019)
 Zera's Shadow (single) (2019)
 Some Day Soon (single) (2020)
 The Zeramin Game (2020)

With Dampf:
 The Arrival (2022)

References

1987 births
Living people
Swedish Christians
Swedish heavy metal guitarists
Swedish heavy metal singers